Baraeus granulosus is a species of beetle in the family Cerambycidae. It was described by Stephan von Breuning in 1938. It is known from Mozambique, Kenya, and Somalia.

References

Pteropliini
Beetles described in 1938